Leonardo Gribeo (16th Century) was an Italian conquistador, in service of the Spanish Crown. In 1536, he was part of the expedition of Pedro de Mendoza in the Río de la Plata, having an active participation in the conquest of Buenos Aires and Asunción.

Biography 

According to some authors Gribeo was born in Cagliari, Sardinia. In 1535 he arrived at the Río de la Plata in the expedition led by Pedro de Mendoza, participating in the first foundation of the city of Buenos Aires.

Leonardo Gribeo had an intense political activity as conqueror of Asunción, a city where he held various public offices, including regidor, procurator and ombudsman. His wife was Isabel Martin, daughter of conquistador Manuel Martin.

References

External links 
portalguarani.com

16th-century explorers
Explorers of Argentina
People from Asunción
Spanish colonial governors and administrators
Year of birth unknown
Río de la Plata